Down is a townland in County Westmeath, Ireland.

Down is one of 11 townlands of the civil parish of Tyfarnham in the barony of Corkaree in the Province of Leinster. 
The River Gaine, forming the eastern boundary of the townland, is a tributary of the River Inny.

The neighbouring townlands are: Tyfarnham to the north, Galmoylestown Lower to the east, Garrysallagh and Loughanstown to the south and Knightswood  and Rathlevanagh to the west.

In the 1911 census of Ireland there was 1 house and 3 inhabitants in the townland.

References

External links
Down at the IreAtlas Townland Data Base
Down at Townlands.ie
Down at Logainm.ie

Townlands of County Westmeath